The Kronach  is a river in Upper Franconia, Bavaria, Germany. From there it flows in a generally southerly direction to its confluence with the Haßlach at the town of Kronach. The ST2200 road, which connects those two places, follows its valley.

See also
List of rivers of Bavaria

References

Rivers of Bavaria
Rivers of Germany